Baer (or Bär, from ) or Van Baer is a surname. Notable people with the surname include:

Baer
 Alan Baer, American tuba player
 Arthur "Bugs" Baer (1886–1969), American journalist and humorist
 Buddy Baer (1915–1986), American boxer
 Byron Baer (1929–2007), American politician
 Carl Baer (1918–1996), American  basketball player
 Clara Gregory Baer (1863–1938), American inventor of netball, Newcomb ball and author of first rules of women's basketball
 Dale Baer (1950–2021), American character animator
 Donald M. Baer (1931–2002), American developmental psychologist
 Eric Baer (born 1932), American polymer researcher
 George A. Baer (1903–1994), German/Swiss/American bookbinder
 George Baer Jr. (1763–1834), American politician
 George Frederick Baer (1842–1914), American lawyer and executive
 Harold Baer Jr. (1933–2014), American judge
 Jack Baer (1914–2002), American college baseball coach
 Jack Baer (art dealer) (1924–2016), British art dealer
 Jo Baer (born 1929), American painter associated with minimalist art
 John Baer (actor) (1923–2006), American actor, Terry and the Pirates
 John Baer (journalist), American journalist, Philadelphia Daily News
 John Metz Baer, American educational psychologist
 John Miller Baer (1886–1970), American congressman from North Dakota
 John Willis Baer (1861–1931), American Presbyterian leader and college president
 Julius Baer (1857–1922), Swiss banker
 Karl Ernst von Baer (1792–1876), Estonian biologist
 Kent Baer (born 1951), American football coach
 Larry Baer (born 1957), President and chief executive officer of the San Francisco Giants
 Les Baer, founder of Les Baer Custom, Inc
 Libbie C. Riley Baer (1849–1929), American poet
 Max Baer (boxer) (1909–1959), American boxer
 Max Baer Jr. (born 1937), American actor and director
 Meridith Baer (born 1947), businesswoman, actress, and screenwriter
 Nicolai Reymers Baer (c. 1550–c. 1600), aka Ursus, German mathematician
 Susanne Baer (born 1964), German judge and legal scholar
 Parley Baer (1914–2002), American actor
 Ralph H. Baer (1922–2014), American inventor
 Reinhold Baer (1902–1979), German mathematician
 Richard Baer (1911–1963), German Nazi SS concentration camp commandant
 Richard Baer (screenwriter) (1928–2008), American screenwriter
 Robert Baer (born 1952), American CIA officer and writer
 Steve Baer (born 1938), American inventor
 Thomas M. Baer, American physicist
 Will Christopher Baer (born 1966), American writer
 William Jacob Baer (1860–1941), American painter
 Wolfgang Baer (1944-2021), German/American theoretical physicist
 Vladimir Baer (1853–1905), Russian captain
 Yitzhak Baer (1888–1980), German-born Israeli historian

Van Baer
 Van Baer (family), Middle Age noble family from the Dutch province of Gelderland
 Frederik Johan van Baer (1645–1713), Dutch officer in the military service of William III of Orange
 Stanny van Baer (born 1942), Dutch model and beauty queen, Miss International 1961

See also 
 Bahr (surname)
 Bähr, Bähr
 Bär
 Baire
 Bare (disambiguation)

German-language surnames
Americanized surnames
Jewish surnames
Surnames from nicknames